The Catholic Diocese of Wiawso is a diocese located in Wiawso in the Ecclesiastical province of Cape Coast in Ghana.

History
 December 22, 1999: Established as Diocese of Wiawso from the Diocese of Sekondi–Takoradi

Special churches
The Cathedral is Cathedral of St. Joseph in Wiawso.

Leadership
 Bishops of Wiawso (Roman rite)
 Bishop Joseph Francis Kweku Essien (since December 22, 1999)

See also
Catholicism in Ghana

Sources
 GCatholic.org
 Catholic Hierarchy

Christian organizations established in 1999
Catholic Church in Ghana
1999 establishments in Ghana
Roman Catholic Ecclesiastical Province of Cape Coast